Jinghu Circuit or Jinghu Province was one of the major circuits during the Song dynasty from 985 and 998. In 998 it was divided into 2 circuits: Jinghu North Circuit and Jinghu South Circuit.

Its administrative area corresponds to roughly the modern provinces of Hunan, southern Hubei and northeastern Guangxi.

References
 

Circuits of the Song dynasty